Metlawala is a village in the Punjab of Pakistan. It is located at 30°57'30N 70°51'30E with an altitude of 137 metres (452 feet).

References

Villages in Punjab, Pakistan